The Camões Prize (Portuguese, Prémio Camões), named after Luís de Camões, is the most important prize for literature in the Portuguese language. It is awarded annually by the Portuguese Direção-Geral do Livro, dos Arquivos e das Biblioteca (National Book, Archive an Libraries Department) and the Brazilian Fundação Biblioteca Nacional (National Library Foundation) to the author of an outstanding oeuvre of work written in Portuguese.

History
This award is considered the premier literary prize in the Portuguese-speaking world and is granted on the basis of the entirety of one's work.

The Camões Prize is awarded annually, alternating between the two countries, and based on decision of a specially designated jury. The award consists of a cash amount resulting from the contributions from Brazil and Portugal, and is set annually by mutual agreement.

The Camões Prize was first introduced by the Additional Protocol to the Cultural Agreement between the Government of the Portuguese Republic and the Government of the Federal Republic of Brazil, dated September 7, 1966, which creates the Camões Prize, signed in Brasilia on June 22, 1988, and approved in Portugal by Decree No. 43/88 of November 30, 1988.

This Protocol was replaced by a new one between the Portuguese Republic and the Federative Republic of Brazil, signed in Lisbon on April 17, 1999, approved by Portugal through Decree 47/99 in the official gazette of November 5, 1999.

The Laureates

Winners per country 
  – 14
  – 14
  – 3
  – 2
  – 2

References 

Portuguese-language literary awards
Brazilian literary awards
Portuguese literary awards
Awards established in 1989
1989 establishments in Brazil
1989 establishments in Portugal
Literary awards honoring lifetime achievement